Edwin Llewellyn Pain (2 June 1891 – 14 July 1947) was a Welsh cricketer and Royal Navy sailor. Pain was a right-handed batsman who bowled right-arm medium pace. He was born in Swansea, Glamorgan.

Pain made his only first-class appearance for the Royal Navy against the Army at Lord's in 1926. In this match he scored 17 runs in the Royal Navy first-innings, before being dismissed by Philip Davies. In their second-innings he scored a single run before being dismissed by Kenneth Mackessack. With the ball he claimed 3 wickets in the Army's first-innings. In 1932 he played four Minor Counties Championship fixtures for Devon.

He died in Plymouth, Devon on 14 July 1947.

References

External links
Edwin Pain at ESPNcricinfo
Edwin Pain at CricketArchive

1891 births
1947 deaths
Cricketers from Swansea
Welsh cricketers
Royal Navy cricketers
Devon cricketers
Royal Navy sailors